Niko Gjyzari (born 10 November 1934) is a former Albanian economist and politician who served as Minister of Finances in the Çarçani II Government and later as General Director of the Bank of Albania. He was selected as a member candidate of the Politburo of the Labour Party of Albania at the 10th party congress.

Biography
Niko Gjyzari was born on November 10, 1934, in Vlorë, Albanian Kingdom. He finished his primary education in his hometown and later attended the financial technical school "January 11" in Tirana. In 1961, he graduated from the Faculty of Economics at the University of Tirana. From 1956 to 1974, he worked as inspector and chief of finance at the executive committee in Vlorë District. Between 1974 and 1975, he served as budget director inside the Ministry of Finances. From 1975 to 1984 he was Deputy Minister of Finances and from 1984 to 1985 was elevated to the post of Minister of Finances. After his short tenure in charge of the ministry, he was appointed chairman of the State Planning Commission, a post he held until 1990. In that same year, he was named Secretary General of the Council of Ministers. In January 1991, Gjyzari took the important role of General Director (governor) of the Bank of Albania. In June 1991, he became a candidate member of the Politburo of the Labour Party at the 10th party congress. From August 1991 to May 1992, he served as Deputy General Director of the bank.

References

Government ministers of Albania
Finance ministers of Albania
Governors of the Bank of Albania
Albanian economists
People from Vlorë
1934 births
Living people